Matías López (born 29 January 1996) is a Paraguayan swimmer. He competed in the men's 200 metre backstroke event at the 2017 World Aquatics Championships.

References

1996 births
Living people
Paraguayan male swimmers
Place of birth missing (living people)
Swimmers at the 2014 Summer Youth Olympics
South American Games gold medalists for Paraguay
South American Games silver medalists for Paraguay
South American Games bronze medalists for Paraguay
South American Games medalists in swimming
Competitors at the 2018 South American Games
Competitors at the 2022 South American Games
Swimmers at the 2019 Pan American Games
Male backstroke swimmers
Pan American Games competitors for Paraguay
21st-century Paraguayan people